Swaffham Bulbeck Priory was a priory in Cambridgeshire, England.

References

Monasteries in Cambridgeshire